The Uruguayan Red Cross was founded in 1897 and it has its headquarters in Montevideo.

Origins
In 1897, on the wake of the Revolution of 1897, the philanthropist Aurelia Ramos de Segarra established the Red Cross of Christian Ladies.

See also
 International Red Cross and Red Crescent Movement

References

External links

 Official website
 Americas Regional Office of the Red Cross

Red Cross and Red Crescent national societies
1897 establishments in Uruguay
Organizations established in 1897
Medical and health organizations based in Uruguay